Matthew Bunson (born 1966) is an American author of more than fifty books, a historian, professor, editor, Roman Catholic theologian, Senior Contributor for EWTN, the Catholic multimedia network, Senior Fellow at the St. Paul Center for Biblical Theology, and Faculty Chair at Catholic Distance University.

He is the author of the books Encyclopedia of the Roman Empire, Encyclopedia of American Catholic History, and Pope Francis, the first English-language biography of Pope Francis in 2013.

Biography
His father was a U.S. military officer, Lt. Colonel Stephen M. Bunson (1924-1984), who was also interested in old Egyptian history.

Education
Bunson has a B.A. in history, an M.A. in Theology, a Master of Divinity, a Doctorate in Ministry and a Ph.D. in Church History from the Graduate Theological Foundation.

Career
He is on the faculty of the Catholic Distance University where he teaches Church History, including Roman Catholic-Islamic relations and Medieval and American Catholic History, and Catholic Social Teaching.

He is a Senior Fellow of the St. Paul Center for Biblical Theology.

Bunson is active in Catholic radio and hosts his own radio program, "Faithworks," for the Redeemer Radio network in Indiana, co-hosts EWTN's Register Radio. Bunson is a frequent guest on National Catholic radio programs, including Al Kresta, the Son Rise Morning Show, Drew Mariani, and Teresa Tomeo, and has appeared on the television networks Fox News, MSNBC, CNN, NBC News, CBS Radio, the BBC, and Channel 24 in Europe.

He served as the general editor of Our Sunday Visitor's Catholic Almanac  and The Catholic Answer.

He has served as a consultant for USA Today on Catholic matters.

In 2016, Bunson joined EWTN as Senior Contributor and Senior Editor for the National Catholic Register.

Personal life
Bunson is married and lives in Washington, D.C. He is a member of the Equestrian Order of the Holy Sepulchre of Jerusalem.

Books
He is an author of more than 50 books, including:
 Encyclopedia of the Roman Empire
 The Encyclopedia of Catholic History
 The Encyclopedia of Saints
  All Shall Be Well
 Papal Wisdom
 The Pope Encyclopedia
 Encyclopedia of American Catholic History
 Angels A-Z, an Encyclopedia
 Pope Benedict XVI and the Sexual Abuse Crisis (co-author)
 We Have a Pope! Pope Benedict XVI
 Encyclopedia of the Middle Ages
 The Angelic Doctor
 Apostle of the Exiled: St. Damien of Molokai
 Saint Kateri Tekakwitha
 Encyclopedia Sherlockiana
 The Agatha Christie Encyclopedia

References

External links
 All books by Matthew Bunson
 EWTN Bookmark - Matthew Bunson and Pope Francis

1966 births
Living people
21st-century American historians
21st-century American male writers
American male writers
American theologians
Graduate Theological Foundation alumni
American male non-fiction writers